Taihe is a town under the administration of Xichang, Sichuan, China. , it has two residential neighborhoods and three villages under its administration:
Neighborhoods
Taikang Community
Xiaomaliu Community

Villages
Taihe Village
Tai'an Village
Jiulong Village

References 

Township-level divisions of Sichuan
Xichang